Love Sonia is a 2018 Indian Hindi-language drama film directed by Tabrez Noorani and produced by David Womark. The film features newcomer Mrunal Thakur as the title character along with Riya Sisodiya, Freida Pinto, Demi Moore, Manoj Bajpayee, Richa Chadda, Anupam Kher, Adil Hussain, Rajkummar Rao, and Sai Tamhankar. Love Sonia had its world premiere at the London Indian Film Festival on 21 June 2018. The film was released in India on 14 September 2018.

Synopsis
The film is about two sisters robbed of their innocence when one is sold by her debt-ridden father, and the other follows after her in the hope of rescuing her but becomes trapped in the sex trade herself. While on a troublesome and challenging journey that takes us through the red-light districts of Mumbai, the latent innocence in the younger sister and the grit to rescue her sister and eventually herself stays intact.

Plot
Preeti and Sonia are two daughters of a debt-ridden poor farmer, Shiva, who lives approximately 1400 kms away from Mumbai. The sisters love each other deeply and are willing to go to any length to protect each other. A village boy named Amar is deeply in love with Sonia. Amar helps the sisters create their individual email IDs to stay in touch with each other. 
Shiva, who is indebted to a local landlord Dada Thakur, agrees to sell Preeti to a prostitute Anjali, to pay off his debt. Sonia desperately attempts to save Preeti from being sold but fails. That night, she mercifully requests Dada Thakur to send her to Mumbai, to meet Preeti. Subsequently, Anjali whisks away Sonia to Mumbai under the pretext of reuniting her with Preeti. Anjali sells her in a brothel owned by Faizal a.k.a. Babu and controlled by the brothel madame Madhuri. Sonia is terribly scared and traumatized by the atmosphere of the brothel. Another prostitute Rashmi befriends her. Sonia while trying to escape from the brothel is caught by Faizal who threatens to kill her if she tries to run away again. 
After multiple pleas, Faizal agrees to let Sonia meet Preeti, who has become a drug-addict, high profile prostitute. Preeti angrily reprimands Sonia for letting their dad sell her and throws her away. Meanwhile, Shiva begs Dada Thakur to return Sonia to him. Anjali provides Shiva the address to Kamathipura and directs him to Mumbai. Shiva frantically searches for Sonia in all the red-light areas of Mumbai. Meanwhile, a social worker named Manish approaches Sonia and extracts details about Preeti from her. He raids Faizal's brothel to rescue Sonia and another pre-teen named Asha. However, Sonia refuses to leave. 
Rashmi severs ties with Sonia when she accuses her of stealing Preeti's anklet, the only souvenir of Preeti left with Sonia. Faizal ships off Madhuri, Sonia and several other girls to Hong Kong in a cargo container. Madhuri, who till that time was hostile towards Sonia, starts looking after her affectionately. Sonia ends up getting raped by a Chinese customer. She forcefully undergoes a hymen reconstruction procedure to prove her a virgin. The girls are again shipped to Los Angeles, where a relatively friendly client allows Sonia to get in touch with Amar via email. He also gifts her a mobile phone. At a party, Madhuri commits suicide by slitting her wrist. 
Sonia runs away from her handlers, deep into the forests. A destitute Sonia, while trying to eat from a dustbin, is rescued by a social worker Salma who runs a NGO named C.A.S.T. Sonia finally finds peace of mind in the shelter home along with several other rescued girls and women. One day, Salma and Manish surprise her by reconnecting her with Preeti over a video call. Preeti tearfully asks for forgiveness and requests her to return. Six months later, Sonia returns to Manish's shelter home where she shockingly finds out that Preeti goes back to prostitution due to her drug addiction. 
Sonia begins her life all over again with a renewed hope in the shelter home. Her parents come to meet her but refuse to accept her back. She also patches up with Amar. Finally, she sends an email to Preeti stating that no matter what happens, she will surely find her someday.

Cast
 Mrunal Thakur as Sonia  
 Freida Pinto as Rashmi
 Sai Tamhankar as Anjali
 Mark Duplass as an American expatriate
 Manoj Bajpayee as Faizal
 Rajkummar Rao as Manish
 Richa Chadda as Madhuri
 Riya Sisodiya as Preeti Singhania 
 Anupam Kher as Dada Thakur
 Adil Hussain as Shiva Singhania
 Demi Moore as Selma
 Sunny Pawar as Bang Bang

Production

Development
Tabrez Noorani was inspired to make Love Sonia after he was introduced to the severity of human trafficking in Los Angeles in 2003, when some girls were found in a shipping container from China. One of them was a young Indian girl. The incident inspired Noorani to work with non-governmental organizations focused on trafficking in Los Angeles. He has also participated in several brothel raids. Noorani and Womark met on Ang Lee's Life of Pi and have been working on the project for three years.  This film basically revolves around a scenario that depicts the human trafficking of girls for heinous practices that are portrayed in the red-light areas of Mumbai depicting the sorrow of prostitutes on a large scale.

Casting
Mrunal Thakur was cast in the title role after a year long search of over 2,500 girls.

Filming
The principal photography begins late April 2016 in India and will also film in Hong Kong and Los Angeles.

Awards and nominations

Notes

References

External links
 
 
 
 

Indian drama films
Hindi-language drama films
2010s Hindi-language films
Films set in Los Angeles
2018 films
2018 drama films